Dimturan (also Romanized as Dīmţūrān; also known as Dim Tooran and Dīmţorūn) is a village in Mazkureh Rural District, in the Central District of Sari County, Mazandaran Province, Iran. At the 2006 census, its population was 255, in 67 families.

References 

Populated places in Sari County